Jakub J. Grygiel (born 4 March 1972) is an Ordinary Professor of politics at the Catholic University of America and fellow at The Institute for Human Ecology. He is a senior advisor at The Marathon Initiative and a Visiting National Security Fellow at the Hoover Institution. He is also a book review editor for Orbis. In 2017-2018 he was a senior advisor to the Secretary of State in the Office of Policy Planning working on European affairs. Before joining the Department of State, he was George H. W. Bush Associate Professor at The Paul H. Nitze School of Advanced International Studies (Johns Hopkins University). Grygiel was a Senior Fellow at the Center for European Policy Analysis.

His book, The Unquiet Frontier, co-authored with Wess Mitchell,  has been cited as having had a significant influence on National Security Advisor General H.R. McMaster's formulation of the 2017 U.S. National Security Strategy and the shift of emphasis in U.S. foreign policy to great-power competition. The book argues that rising and revisionist powers, Russia and China, are "probing" the periphery of the U.S.-led international order by placing pressure on U.S. allies, and that the United States should strengthen its alliances as a way of achieving strategic stability.

Grygiel was awarded the 2005 Rear Admiral Ernest M. Eller Prize in Naval History for an article on the US Navy in the early Cold War. He has written extensively on geopolitics, seapower, Russian foreign policy, European politics, and US foreign policy. His writings on international relations and security studies have appeared in Foreign Affairs, The American Interest, Security Studies, Journal of Strategic Studies, Orbis, Commentary, Parameters, as well as several U.S. and foreign newspapers.

Grygiel earned a Ph.D., M.A. and an MPA from Princeton University, and a BSFS summa cum laude from Georgetown University.

Publications

Russia Will Not Be Our Friend Against China (Strategika)
Tools for Victory against Russia and China (National Interest)
The Return of Europe's Nation States (Foreign Affairs)
The Paradox of Great Powers: Allies and Force in Montesquieu's Considerations on the Causes of the Greatness of the Romans and Their Decline (Orbis)
Why is Russia in Syria? (The American Interest)
Germany: The Pacifist Menace (The American Interest)
The EU Can't Fulfill Its Purpose (The American Interest)
How to 'Normalize' Relations with Russia (The American Interest)
Vladimir Putin’s Encirclement of Europe (National Review)
The Role of Values in Foreign Policy (National Review)
The Need for Allies (National Review)
Predators on the Frontier (The American Interest)
Are Tyrants Only Local Thugs? (The American Interest)
The Geopolitical Nihilist (The American Interest)
A Preclusive Strategy to Defend the NATO Frontier (The American Interest)
The Power of Statelessness (Policy Review)
Europe: Strategic Drifter (National Interes t)
Two Princes (The American Interest)
The Russian Autocrat's Eternal Return (The American Interest)
Vacuum Wars (The American Interest)
The Diplomacy Fallacy (The American Interest)
Empires and Barbarians (The American Interest)
The Geopolitics of Europe: Europe's Illusions and Delusions (Orbis)
Elections and Geopolitics (SAISphere)
Empires and Its Discontents (Claremont Review of Books)
Agricola: A Man for Our Times (Orbis)
Imperial Allies (Orbis)
The Dilemmas of US Maritime Supremacy in the Early Cold War (Journal of Strategic Studies).

References

External links
Catholic University of America profile
The Marathon Initiative profile
Hoover Institution profile

Living people
Johns Hopkins University faculty
Princeton University alumni
Walsh School of Foreign Service alumni
United States Department of State officials
Catholic University of America faculty
1972 births